Chaetae or Chaitai  was a town of ancient Macedonia that Ptolemy assigns to Mygdonia. Its location cannot precisely be calculated from Ptolemy's account, which places it between Moryllus (nowadays Ano Apostoli, Kilkis regional unit) and Antigonia (Paeonia) which are some ways apart from one another. The town does not appear in the periplus of the fleet of Xerxes, indicating a location perhaps north of the bay of Thessalonica, near Pontoiraklia, in a place where excavations took place (Tsaoussitsa). Some have identified the town as the Clitae (Κλῖται) – "Κλ" being substituted for "Χα" – in Ptolemy.

References

Ptolemy, III.12.
William Martin Leake, Travels in Northern Greece (J. Rodwell 1835), pp. 460–61.

Geography of ancient Mygdonia
Populated places in ancient Macedonia
Former populated places in Greece
Lost ancient cities and towns